SkyBus International Airlines was a charter airline in Kazakhstan. SkyBus was founded in 2008.

History

Destinations 
SkyBus destinations included (as of May 2016):

Batumi - Alexander Kartveli Batumi International Airport
Tbilisi - Shota Rustaveli International Airport

Aktau - Aktau Airport
Aktobe - Aktobe Airport
Astana - Astana International Airport
Atyrau - Atyrau Airport
Karagandy - Sary-Arka Airport
Kostanay - Kostanay Airport
Kyzylorda - Kyzylorda Airport
Shymkent - Shymkent International Airport

Fleet  
The SkyBus fleet consisted of the following aircraft (as of August 2017):

References

External links
Official website 

Airlines of Kazakhstan
Airlines established in 2008